Landos is a commune in the Haute-Loire department in south-central France.

The Robert Louis Stevenson Trail (GR 70), a popular long-distance path, runs through the town, which is also on a disused railway from Le Puy-en-Velay to Langogne.

Population

See also
 Communes of the Haute-Loire department

References

Communes of Haute-Loire